"If It Wasn't for the Nights" (working title: "Pandemonium") is a song recorded in 1978 by the Swedish pop group ABBA for their sixth studio album, Voulez-Vous.

History
The song was a reflection of Björn Ulvaeus's state of mind during his divorce, an uptempo song with despairing lyrics where the narrator dreads the end of the working day, when they will be all alone to deal with their own thoughts: "There were times that last autumn I was with Agnetha that I had those nights myself. My lyrics were often based around fiction, but that must have been where that one came from."

Appearances
"If It Wasn't for the Nights" was considered by the band members to be one of the strongest songs recorded during the Voulez-Vous sessions, and was originally intended to be the lead single from the album. ABBA performed the song in Japan in November 1978, upon their promotional visit to the country (known as ABBA in Japan). Although ABBA did not film an official video for "If It Wasn't for the Nights", their filmed performance on the Mike Yarwood Christmas Show in December 1978 serves as an "unofficial" music video. These filmed performances of the song differ from the original 5:11 version (lasting 3:42 and 3:50).

In December 1978, a new song entitled "Chiquitita" was recorded, and it was ultimately decided that this would be released as the lead single from the Voulez-Vous album instead. As a result of this decision, "If It Wasn't for the Nights" remained an album track.

Cover versions
 Singer Hazell Dean included a dance cover of the song for her 1996 album The Winner Takes It All: Hazell Dean Sings ABBA.
 A hi-NRG/eurodance cover by Abbacadabra can be found on the 2008 compilation We Love ABBA: The Mamma Mia Dance Compilation, released through Almighty Records. An audio sample can be heard on the official Almighty Records website.

References

1979 songs
ABBA songs
Polar Music singles
Songs written by Benny Andersson and Björn Ulvaeus